The 1957/1958 News of the World Snooker Tournament was a professional snooker tournament sponsored by the News of the World. The tournament was won by Fred Davis who won 4 of his 5 matches, ahead of John Pulman. Pulman also won 4 matches but Davis won more frames overall. The News of the World Snooker Tournament ran from 1949/50 to 1959.

Format
The 1957/1958 event was a round-robin snooker tournament and was played from 14 October 1957 to 15 March 1958. Matches were played at various locations around the United Kingdom and also on Jersey. There were 6 competitors and a total of 15 matches. The competitors were the same as in the previous two seasons, Joe Davis, Fred Davis, Walter Donaldson, John Pulman, Jackie Rea and Rex Williams. Each match lasted three days and was the best of 37 frames.

Each match was separately handicapped. Joe Davis gave Fred Davis and John Pulman, a 10-point start each frame, Walter Donaldson 14, Jackie Rea 17 and Rex Williams 20. Fred Davis gave Walter Donaldson 12, Jackie Rea 14 and Rex Williams 18. John Pulman gave Jackie Rea 14 and Rex Williams 18. Walter Donaldson gave Jackie Rea 7 and Rex Williams 10 while Jackie Rea gave Rex Williams 5 points. The handicaps in the Fred Davis/Pulman and Pulman/Donaldson matches are not known.

Results
Walter Donaldson  made a break of 141 in his opening match against Joe Davis.

Table

The positions were determined firstly by the number of matches won (MW) and, in the event of a tie, the number of frames won (FW).

Broadcasting
The BBC showed a short, 35 minute, TV programme of the final day of the final match from Houldsworth Hall, Manchester. The commentator was Sidney Smith.

References

News of the World Snooker Tournament
News of the World Tournament 1957 58
News of the World Tournament 1957 58
News of the World Tournament
News of the World Tournament
News of the World Tournament